South Carolina Highway 917 (SC 917) is a  state highway in the northeastern part of the U.S. state of South Carolina. It travels from the SC 410/SC 9 Business (SC 9 Bus.) intersection between Green Sea and Loris in Horry County to the SC 38 intersection outside Latta in Dillon County.

Route description

The highway travels in a southeast-to-northwest direction, but is signed as a north–south highway. It travels between SC 410/SC 9 Bus. in the community of Finklea, through Mullins where it has a concurrency with SC 41 and intersects US 76, Latta where it intersects U.S. Route 301 (US 301) and US 501, to SC 38 south of its interchange with I-95.

History

South Carolina Highway 73

South Carolina Highway 73 (SC 73) was a state highway that was established in 1939 from US 301/US 501 in Latta southeast to SC 57 (now SC 41) south-southeast of Fork. In 1942, it was decommissioned and redesignated as SC 573. Today, most of its path is part of SC 917.

Major intersections

See also

References

External links

 SC 917 at Virginia Highways' South Carolina Highways Annex

917
 Transportation in Horry County, South Carolina
 Transportation in Marion County, South Carolina
 Transportation in Dillon County, South Carolina